The Family Man is a 2000 American romantic fantasy comedy-drama film directed by Brett Ratner, from a screenplay by David Diamond and David Weissman. The film stars Nicolas Cage and Téa Leoni, with Don Cheadle, Saul Rubinek, and Jeremy Piven in supporting roles.

The Family Man was theatrically released in the United States on December 22, 2000, by Universal Pictures. The film received mixed reviews from critics and grossed over $124.7 million worldwide against its $60 million budget. At the 27th Saturn Awards, it was nominated for Best Fantasy Film and won Best Actress for Leoni.

Plot
Jack and Kate, who have been together since college, are at JFK Airport, where he is about to leave to take up a twelve-month internship with Barclays in London. She fears the separation will be detrimental to their relationship and asks him not to go, but he reassures her, saying their love is strong enough to last, and he flies out.

Thirteen years later, Jack is now a bachelor living a carefree life as a Wall Street executive in New York City. At work, he is putting together a multi-billion dollar merger and has ordered an emergency meeting on Christmas Day. In his office, on Christmas Eve, he gets a message to contact Kate, but, even though he remembers her, he dismisses it, apparently uninterested.

On his way home, Jack is in a convenience store when a young man, Cash, enters claiming to have a winning lottery ticket worth $238, but the store clerk refuses him, saying the ticket is a forgery. Cash pulls out a gun and threatens him, so Jack offers to buy the ticket and Cash eventually agrees.

Outside, Jack tries to help Cash, to which he responds by asking Jack if anything is missing from his life. Saying he has everything he needs, Cash enigmatically remarks that Jack has brought upon himself what is now going to happen, and walks away. A puzzled Jack returns to his penthouse and sleeps.

On Christmas Day, Jack wakes up in a suburban New Jersey bedroom with Kate and two children. He rushes out to his condo and office in New York, but both doormen refuse his entrance and do not recognize him. Jack runs out into the street and encounters Cash driving Jack's Ferrari. Although Cash offers to explain what is happening, all he says is a vague reference to "The Organization" and that Jack is getting "a glimpse" that will help him to figure out for himself what it's about.

Jack slowly realizes that he is living the kind of life he might have had if he had stayed in the United States with Kate as she had asked. He has a modest family life, where he is a car tire salesman for Kate's father and she is a non-profit lawyer. Jack's young daughter, Annie, thinks he is an alien but a friendly one and assists him in fitting into his new life. With a few setbacks, he begins to succeed, bonding with his children, falling in love with Kate again and working hard at his job.

Taking advantage of a chance meeting when his former boss, chairman Peter Lassiter, comes in to have a tire blowout fixed, Jack uses his business savvy to impress Lassiter, who invites Jack to his office, where Jack worked in his 'other' life.

There, after a short interview, Lassiter offers him a position. While he is excited by the potential salary and other perks, Kate argues that they are very happy and they should be thankful for the life they have.

Having decided that he now likes this 'other' life, Jack again sees Cash, now a store clerk. He demands to stay in this life, but Cash tells him there is no choice: "a glimpse", by definition, is an impermanent thing. That night, Jack tries to stay awake, but fails and wakes the "next day", Christmas Day, to find himself in his original life.

Jack forgoes closing the acquisition deal to intercept Kate, finding her moving out of a luxury townhouse before flying to Paris. Like him, she has focused on her career, and has become a very wealthy corporate lawyer. She had only called him to return a box of his old possessions. Jack chases after her to the airport and, in an effort to stop her leaving, describes in detail their children and family life.

Intrigued, she eventually agrees to go with him for a coffee. From a distance, they are seen talking inaudibly and laughing over their coffees.

Cast

Production

Development 

Producer Marc Abraham first became aware of the project when veteran producers Alan Riche, Tony Ludwig and Howard Rosenman brought the idea to him as a pitch. He was charmed by the uplifting and universal appeal of the premise, which was reminiscent of many of his favorite films of the 1930s and '40s. With a solid screenplay by David Diamond and David Weissman in hand, the filmmakers began to look for a director who could properly present the funny, poignant and somewhat quirky elements of the material while maintaining a tone of sincerity throughout. It was essential to everyone involved that the story not pass judgment on either of the two different lifestyles of Jack Campbell presented. "The Family Man is not about "good choice vs. bad choice" but rather about the nature of choices themselves" said co-writer Weissman. "The idea was about the path not taken."

Before Brett Ratner signed on to the project, the film was originally offered to director Curtis Hanson, who accepted. Ratner was in the middle of directing Rush Hour when his agent kept offering him scripts to consider directing. Ratner told his agent he was more interested in completing  Rush Hour but near the end of the shoot for the film, his agent recommended that he read the script for The Family Man. Ratner originally wasn't interested in directing the film, but after he read the script, he immediately pursued it, saying "It reminded me of the classic films I grew up watching, except it didn't end the way most movies end and that was exciting. I felt this one in my gut. I always follow my instincts and I realized this was something that I really had to do." Ratner was convinced that he was the right choice to direct the film and set his sights on convincing the producers, mostly Abraham.

Abraham, however, wasn't sure about Ratner initially. Meanwhile, Hanson left the project to direct Wonder Boys instead. According to Abraham, "It just didn't seem like his kind of film. But after getting to know him during the entire year he stalked me, I finally figured that maybe he was the right guy for the job. He brought something really original and vibrant to the material". Ratner was officially signed on as the director after the success of Rush Hour.

Like director Ratner, star Nicolas Cage originally wasn't interested in doing a lighthearted romantic comedy drama, as he had already done 8mm and Bringing out the Dead and also finished filming Gone in 60 Seconds, but after he saw Rush Hour with his father, he accepted the part of Jack Campbell as he was inspired to do so after seeing Ratner's enthusiasm for the project. With Cage and director Ratner in place, the filmmakers needed to cast the role of Kate Reynolds, which was the most sought-after role for the film but a difficult one to cast. Both the filmmakers and Cage were impressed with Téa Leoni's ability to convey the intricate subtleties of the role.

Filming 

Principal photography began on November 19, 1999 in Teaneck, New Jersey and Sleepy Hollow, New York, where fall foliage was still in evidence. Academy Award-winning special effects supervisor John Richardson, and his team had to transform the neighborhoods into a winter wonderland to set the snowbound Christmas scene. Filming finished on March 14, 2000. The Family Man was the first collaboration between Ratner and Academy Award-nominated cinematographer Dante Spinotti. They later worked together on Red Dragon, After the Sunset, X-Men: The Last Stand, Tower Heist and Hercules.

Release

Box office
The Family Man opened at #3 at the North American box office making $15.1 million in its opening weekend, behind What Women Want and Cast Away, which opened at the top spot. After 15 weeks in release, the film grossed $75,793,305 in the US and Canada and $48,951,778 elsewhere, bringing the film's worldwide total to $124,745,083.

Critical reception
The Family Man received mixed reviews from critics. Rotten Tomatoes gave the film a score of 53% based on 130 reviews, with an average rating of 5.5/10. The site's consensus states: "Despite good performances by Cage and especially by Leoni, The Family Man is too predictable and derivative to add anything new to the Christmas genre. Also, it sinks under its sentimentality." Metacritic reports a 42 out of 100 rating based on 28 reviews, indicating "mixed or average reviews".

Chris Gore from Film Threat said: "If you're looking for a heartfelt, feel-good holiday movie, just give in and enjoy." Matthew Turner from ViewLondon said: "Perfect feel-good Christmas-period family entertainment. Highly recommended." Common Sense Media rated it 4 out of 5 stars. Movie guide.org rates it four of four stars, noting "The Family Man is a heart-rending movie. Very well written, it makes you laugh and cry. Better yet, it’s an intentionally moral movie. It wants to prove that everyone needs love..."

Emma Cochrane from Empire in 2015 wrote: "This is exactly the kind of adult fantasy you want to see at Christmas and, as such, it's highly enjoyable entertainment", and gave the film 3 stars out of 5.

See also
 List of Christmas films

References

External links

 
 
 
 

2000 films
2000 romantic comedy-drama films
2000s romantic fantasy films
American business films
American Christmas comedy-drama films
American fantasy comedy-drama films
American romantic comedy-drama films
American romantic fantasy films
Alternate timeline films
Films scored by Danny Elfman
Films directed by Brett Ratner
Films produced by Marc Abraham
Films set in 1987
Films set in the 2000s
Films set in New Jersey
Films set in New York City
Films shot in New Jersey
Films shot in New York (state)
Beacon Pictures films
Saturn Films films
Universal Pictures films
Films distributed by Disney
2000s Christmas comedy-drama films
2000s fantasy comedy-drama films
2000s English-language films
2000s American films